Aghasalim Childagh (Azerbaijani: Ağasəlim Çildağ) (February 1, 1930 – April 8, 2008) was a performer of Azerbaijani meykhana music. He was popular across Caucasus, having reached the height of his career in the late 1980s and early 1990s.

Early career
Born in Mashtaga village of Baku, Childagh was interested in performing from an early age. He was taught by Aliagha Vahid and meykhana master Aghahuseyn, which later made him a very successful musician.

Fame
Like many other meykhana artists based in Azerbaijan, Childag spent more time performing in rural areas than at city, due to curfews and musical restrictions in Azerbaijan at the time. Childag became one of the most prolific artists on the meykhana scene, recording around 100 cassettes during his career. In 2006, he received Shohrat Order for his contributions to music.

Later years
After suffering stroke, his health later gradually declined and led him to live impaired health.

References

1930 births
2008 deaths
20th-century Azerbaijani male singers
Meykhana musicians